Nick News (formerly titled Nick News W/5 and later Nick News with Linda Ellerbee) is an American educational television news magazine aimed at children and teenagers. It originally aired on Nickelodeon from 1992 to 2015. It also aired on Nickelodeon's sister network Noggin from 1999 to 2002. Nick News took the form of a highly rated and recognized news program for children and teenagers alike, discussing important social, political and economic issues in a format intended for both children and adults. In June 2020, the show was revived.

The show is known for allowing normal American teenagers to speak out on their own personal opinions on a number of past and current worldwide issues and topics, including events such as Black History Month.

Linda Ellerbee

Nick News was hosted by former NBC News personality Linda Ellerbee from 1992 to 2015. Ellerbee was one of five candidates auditioned over the course of two weeks. She was chosen because her competitors were "too loud and obnoxious", claimed one of the show's set designers. According to Ellerbee: "I was honored when I was named the host of Nick News. The show will be about kids and their everyday lives." Ellerbee has never missed an episode due to illness. The show is officially known as Nick News with Linda Ellerbee. Throughout the years, Nick News has featured special guests of honor, such as Al Gore, Faith Hill, Rosie O'Donnell, Magic Johnson, Bill Clinton, and Dr. Phil.

History
Nick News was originally known as Nick News W/5 until the show's "who, what, when, where, and why" type format was dropped.

During its original run, Nick News with Linda Ellerbee was telecast on Sunday nights at 8:00 p.m. and later 8:30 p.m. on Nickelodeon, and ran in repeats at various timeslots. Nick News was #1 in the ratings on Nickelodeon in 1992–1993, and has never gone below #6 in the ratings, making it one of the most consistently highly rated news shows on TV. From 1993 to 1997, the first-run syndicated version of the show—distributed by Viacom Enterprises (now CBS Media Ventures)—aired on local stations—both independent and network-affiliated—all over the United States of America. The show won a Peabody Awards in 1994, and Linda Ellerbee won a Personal Award in 1998 for her work on the show.

The show also previously appeared on early weekday mornings, fully commercial-free as a part of the television cable industry's Cable in the Classroom initiative, which urged teachers from schools across the globe to tape episodes of Nick News and show them to their classes during school hours.

The show was a regular part of the lineup on the Noggin channel, one of Nickelodeon's sister networks, from February 1999 until March 2002.

TeenNick aired two episodes of the show in repeats on both October 25, 2010, and February 15, 2011, and also aired once as part of their nightly block The Splat from November 5–6 (Election Day 2016 weekend).

Nick News is well known for many trademarks during its run on Nickelodeon, such as Ellerbee's signature tagline, "If you want to know, ask!"

After nearly 25 years on the air, an hour-long finale titled "Hello, I Must Be Going: 25 Years of Nick News with Linda Ellerbee" aired on Nickelodeon on December 15, 2015. The episode featured clips from older episodes of the series. The final episode was nominated for a Primetime Emmy Award for Outstanding Children's Program, a category for which the series had been nominated 22 times, with nine wins across the series's 23-year history.

Revival
On June 23, 2020, Nickelodeon announced that it would be reviving Nick News in a series of hour-long specials. The first installment, titled Kids, Race and Unity: A Nick News Special, premiered on June 29 and was hosted by U.S. musician Alicia Keys. Kids, Race and Unity was made in direct response to the wave of protests and unrest following the murder of George Floyd, with its purpose being to "amplify the voices and experiences of Black children across the country". A number of special guests appeared on the program, including Black Lives Matter co-founders Patrisse Cullors, Alicia Garza, and Opal Tometi; teen activist Marley Dias, founder of the #1000BlackGirlsBook campaign; 12-year-old singer and viral sensation Keedron Bryant; Ibram X. Kendi, author of Antiracist Baby; Teens4Equality founders Jade Fuller, Nya Collins, Zee Thomas, Kennedy Green, Emma Rose Smith and Mikayla Smith; social media star Tabitha Brown and her family; and family therapist, Dr. George James.

In its current iteration, Nickelodeon has partnered with its corporate sibling CBS News on presentation. On October 6, 2020, 60 Minutes veteran Magalie Laguerre-Wilkinson was tapped as executive producer of the Nick News revival, as well as the newly-developed vice president of news programming for Nickelodeon. CBS News correspondent Jamie Yuccas serves as the host, while reporters Vladimir Duthiers, Enrique Acevedo, and Imtiaz Tab also contribute. Nick News also appears as interstitials during regular Nickelodeon programming to cover current events.

Notable episodes
In 1993, a then-12-year-old Meghan Markle was featured after writing letters to get a company to change a national television commercial she viewed as sexist.

In 1993, there was an episode on global warming entitled "Plan it for the Planet".  On December 9, 2007, Nick News had shown another global warming special entitled "A Global Warning From the Kids of the World". Both specials looked at different regions of the Earth like Australia, Alaska, the Netherlands, the Philippines, California and Kenya, showing the changes in the climate and the effects of those changes. During the later part of the December 9, 2007, episode, Nobel Prize winner Al Gore talked to children about the issues that global warming is causing for ordinary people.

In 2002, Nick News celebrated its 10th anniversary, adds with a special called "Happy Birthday, Nick News". It featured many flashbacks from the first 10 years of Nick News.

On June 18, 2002, Nickelodeon showed "Nick News Special Edition: My Family Is Different". This had one of the largest audiences in Nick News''' history. The show featured regular children talking about different issues that have had a major effect on their personal lives, including hate crimes, child abuse and sexual harassment. During this episode, openly lesbian parent Rosie O'Donnell appeared on Nick News'' to talk with the children and Ellerbee about being different, with other well-known people as well. The show has also included children from households across the globe that oppose LGBT rights, as well as conservative commentator Jerry Falwell.

On October 12, 2008, an episode called "Nickelodeon's Kids Pick the President"  featured children from across the United States asking political, economic and health care questions of Democrat Barack Obama and Republican John McCain, as part of a way for American children to choose. Obama was chosen as the winner in that year's Kids Pick the President poll.

Neil Young appeared in an episode with his son who was diagnosed with autism and their love of model trains.

Video releases

References

External links

1990s American children's television series
1990s American television news shows
1990s Nickelodeon original programming
1992 American television series debuts
2000s American children's television series
2000s American television news shows
2000s Nickelodeon original programming
2010s American children's television series
2010s American television news shows
2010s Nickelodeon original programming
2015 American television series endings
2020s American children's television series
2020s American television news shows
2020s Nickelodeon original programming
2020 American television series debuts
American children's education television series
American television series revived after cancellation
Current affairs shows
English-language education television programming
Peabody Award-winning television programs
Television Academy Honors winners